WSJP (1640 AM) is a radio station licensed to Sussex, Wisconsin and owned by Relevant Radio. It broadcasts Catholic-based religious programming; along with WSJP-FM (100.1), it is one of two Relevant Radio stations in the Milwaukee metropolitan area.

History
WSJP began as the "expanded band" twin to a station broadcasting on the standard AM band, which originally signed on in 1979 as WCQL (Waukesha County Quality Listening), a highly directional daytime-only station licensed to Pewaukee at 1370 AM. After a failure to generate adequate ratings or revenue, the station's owners, George and Mary Scoufis, experimented with a contemporary Christian music format in the early 1980s until it was sold to a group of investors. Those investors turned the station into a 24-hour station (requiring the change in community of license to Sussex), changed the call letters to WGNW and launched a news-talk format. However the low power prevented the station from ever seriously competing against powerhouses like WTMJ and WISN.

In 1985, the owners ended the news talk format, and entered into a local marketing agreement with Wisconsin Petra Productions, which changed the call letters to WKSH, re-branded the station as KS-14 and programmed a Christian rock music format. Later, a group called Heir Force Ministries operated the station for a number of years. In the 1990s the station's programming was taken over by Life Message who changed the format to a more conservative mix of teaching and inspirational music.

Expanded Band assignment

On March 17, 1997 the Federal Communications Commission (FCC) announced that eighty-eight stations had been given permission to move to newly available "Expanded Band" transmitting frequencies, ranging from 1610 to 1700 kHz, with WKSH authorized to move from 1370 kHz to 1640 kHz. The FCC's initial policy was that both the original station and its expanded band counterpart could operate simultaneously for up to five years, after which owners would have to turn in one of the two licenses, depending on whether they preferred the new assignment or elected to remain on the original frequency. The new station on 1640 AM was originally assigned the call sign WAZI. On August 10, 1998 the two stations swapped call letters, with WKSH going to 1640 AM, and WAZI transferred to 1370 AM. On December 15, 1999, the license for 1370 AM was then cancelled, as station programming moved to 1640 kHz.

Later history

In late 2002, WKSH's owner shut down their business, and Disney's ABC Radio Networks division bought the station in order to convert the station to Radio Disney. WKSH carried the network's entire schedule except for some local-specific public affairs programming on Sunday mornings, and automated station identifications, although the station maintained a local staff which promoted the station through public events, live remotes and contests and did so on air from time-to-time.

In June 2013, Disney put WKSH and six other Radio Disney stations in medium markets up for sale, in order to refocus the network's broadcast distribution on top-25 markets. Disney did not own the studio building, nor the transmitter site — a lease remained in effect for several years — which complicated the sale. After Radio Disney's removal, the station, which had also transmitted in HD Radio, began to transmit in analog-only permanently.  (Radio Disney eventually returned to the market through Entercom's WMYX-HD2 (99.1-2) in 2017 until the fall of 2018 under the network's new HD Radio leased access model.)

On September 29, 2013, WKSH was taken off-the-air. Until it was sold, it continued to come back on the air occasionally at the end of each month with a continuous loop of Broadway tunes and easy listening music between station identifications, due to its special temporary authority to remain silent having not had action taken upon it by the FCC. This allowed the station to maintain its license by having some content air in each thirty-day period.

In November 2013, when Disney filed to sell its Richmond, Virginia station, WDZY, to a subsidiary of Wilkins Parent Corporation, it stated that WKSH would also be acquired by Wilkins. That deal never appeared in the FCC database; in March 2014, Disney instead filed to sell the station for $725,000 to Starboard Media Foundation, which broadcasts Catholic programming on its stations through the Relevant Radio network. WKSH was the network's second station in the market, as Relevant Radio already served Milwaukee's northern suburbs on WSJP-FM (100.1 FM).

The sale was "consummated" on May 30, 2014, and that same day the call letters were changed to WSJP. On June 3, the station returned to the air broadcasting Relevant Radio's schedule.

References

External links 
WSJP website, from Relevant Radio

FCC History Cards for operation on 1370 kHz (covering 1978-1980 as WCQL)

SJP-AM
SJP (AM)
Catholic radio stations
Radio stations established in 1979
1979 establishments in Wisconsin
Relevant Radio stations
Former subsidiaries of The Walt Disney Company